Gaylord G. Birch (March 10, 1946 – April 14, 1996) was a drummer for the bands Santana, Graham Central Station, Cold Blood, Pointer Sisters & Herbie Hancock.

History

Birch was the drummer for the Pointer Sisters during 1974 and performed many live performances with the group. Birch also appeared in the band Santana during 1976 and again in 1991, as well as playing the drums for a number of Herbie Hancock performances. In 1979, he joined Merl Saunders & Jerry Garcia in Reconstruction, a band which also included Ed Neumeister (trombone), Ron Stallings (tenor sax & vocals) and John Kahn (bass). This band existed for just a few months during 1979. The only traces remaining are live recordings made in Bay Area's clubs and small venues.

Birch also played drums briefly with Cold Blood, and is on the recordings Thriller! (1973) and Live at the Record Plant Sausalito, CA JUL 2, 1974. He played and recorded with Charles Brown in the 1980s. In the early 1970s Birch also played for Graham Central Station, Melissa Ethridge and recorded with Santana and Stevie Wonder. Birch also started his own band called the Birchworks, a local band that played in local clubs in the bay area. Birch was known as the go-to drummer whenever a recording or a band needed someone to fill in. He was one of the most versatile drummers around, playing any genre that was required of him. He was a very learned drummer.

Personal life
He was married to JoAnn Biagas, with whom he had a son, Gaylord Gibson Birch III; their marriage ended in 1978. In 1986, Birch married Mary Irene McCrea. In 1991, they welcomed the birth of daughter Irene Audrey, and, in 1994, a son Edward Anderson. Birch died on April 14, 1996, of cancer at age 50.

References

External links 
 Gaylord Birch credits at AllMusic
 Gaylord Birch credits at Discogs

1946 births
1996 deaths
20th-century American drummers
American male drummers
20th-century American male musicians
Jerry Garcia Band members
Santana (band) members
Reconstruction (band) members